Sacred Heart School, Rayagada is a Co-ed English medium Catholic education private school in the town of Rayagada, Odisha.

History
Sacred Heart School, Rayagada is a Catholic Institution, established and managed by the North Indian Province of the Congregation of the Mission (C.M.) under Acts 29 and 30 of the constitution of India. It maintains its Christian atmosphere, identity and character. Here students are prepared for the Xth class examination of the Council for Indian Certificate of Secondary Education (ICSE) New Delhi, to which it is affiliated.
 
It is also recognized by the Education Department of the State Government of Orissa. The medium of instruction is English with Hindi and Oriya as the second languages. The school has been granted the Christian Minority Right Status since 2008. Its registration No. is F.No. 705 of 2007-25236.Sacred Heart School has its own (private) building. The school has total 24 classrooms.

This school also has a playground. Sacred Heart School does not provide any residential facility.

Academics
The lowest Class is 1 and the highest class in the school is 10. This  There is a library facility available in this school.

Principals
 Sr. Berchmans from 1971 to 1972
 Sr. Jose Sartho from 1972 to 1975
 Sr. Veronica from 1975 to 1977
 Sr. Philomina P from 1977 to 1978
 Sr. Eymard from 1978 to 1983
 Sr. Philoman K from 1983 to 1984
 Sr. Monica P from 1984 to 1984
 Sr. Annie Grace from 1986 to 1986
 Sr. Eymard from 1986 to 1989
 Fr. Devassy P from 1989 to 1994
 Fr. Sebastian TJ from 1994 to 2003
 Fr. N. Mathew from 2003 to 2010
 Fr Prakash from 2010 to 2017
Fr George from 2017 to 2022
 Fr Anant Nayak from 2022 till date

School Alumni
 Ritesh Aggarwal - CEO & Founder of OYO Rooms

References

External links
 website of the school

Primary schools in India
High schools and secondary schools in Odisha
Christian schools in Odisha
Education in Rayagada district
Educational institutions established in 1969
1969 establishments in Orissa